In German history, the Hitler Youth generation refers to the generation of Germans born approximately between 1922 and 1930 and who experienced childhood, adolescence, and early adulthood in Nazi Germany (1933–1945). It is one of several terms used in social historians and sociologists similar to the Flakhelfer generation or Forty-fivers which may differ slightly in scope. It is conventionally argued that the immersion of this group within Nazi social and ideological structures, such as the Hitler Youth or League of German Girls, made this group the most "fanatical" adherents of Nazi ideology. According to the historian Gabriele Rosenthal:

The size of this generation is estimated at approximately nine million and the following cohort is sometimes described as the War generation. In contrast with older age groups it is also argued that the Hitler Youth generation emerged from the Second World War with little experience of combat and mortality than older age groups and were accordingly a preponderant demography during the early post-war years in West Germany and East Germany as late as the 1960s.

References

Further reading

Social history of Germany
Cultural generations
Historiography of Germany
Historiography of Nazi Germany